Temple Israel Center is a traditional, conservative, fully egalitarian congregation located in White Plains, New York.

Clergy

Senior rabbi
A native of New York City, Rabbi Gordon Tucker holds the A.B. degree from Harvard University and a Ph.D. (in Philosophy) from Princeton University. He was ordained a Rabbi in 1975 by The Jewish Theological Seminary of America (JTSA).
Since coming to Temple Israel Center, Rabbi Tucker has worked to strengthen three primary areas of Jewish life: education for all ages, the spirituality of worship, and the obligation to reach out to the less fortunate.
Rabbi Tucker joined the faculty of JTSA in 1976 and has taught there continuously ever since. He is currently Adjunct Assistant Professor of Jewish Philosophy. From 1984 to 1992, he was Dean of the Rabbinical School at JTSA, in which capacity he directed the training of over 200 rabbis.
He is Honorary Chairman (and former Chairman) of the Board of the Masorti Foundation for Conservative Judaism in Israel, and served on the Committee on Jewish Law and Standards of the Rabbinical Assembly from 1982 to 2007.
While on a leave of absence from JTSA beginning in 1979, Rabbi Tucker served as a White House Fellow in the office of United States Attorney General Benjamin R. Civiletti.
Rabbi Tucker is the author of numerous articles on a wide range of subjects in Jewish thought, and most recently published a translation with commentary (entitled "Heavenly Torah") on Rabbi Abraham Joshua Heschel's major three-volume Hebrew work on rabbinic theology.

Cantor
Cantor George Mordecai was born in Sydney, Australia to Iraqi and Indian Jewish parents. He received a B.A. in history from the University of New South Wales and his Cantorial and master's degrees in sacred music from the Jewish Theological Seminary in 2000. He has previously worked as the Cantor at Temple Beth Zion Beth Israel in Philadelphia, Temple Emanu-El in Miami, Florida, and comes to TIC from Temple Beth El in Stamford, Connecticut, where he served for four years.

Associate rabbi
Ari Isenberg-Grzeda was ordained as Rabbi by the Jewish Theological Seminary of America where he also achieved an M.A. in Sacred Music. While at the Seminary, he was named Tanenbaum Fellow of Toronto's Beth Tzedec, Leffell Fellow of AIPAC, and Rabbinic Intern-in-Residence of Masorti France's Dor Vador, Maayane Or, and Saint Germain-en-Laye communities. Upon ordination, Ari returned to Halifax, Nova Scotia, where he had previously served Congregation Shaar Shalom as Spiritual Leader for several years. Ari served as Associate Chaplain of Dalhousie University and was elected to the Executive Committee of the Canadian Rabbinic Caucus for the Centre for Israel and Jewish Affairs (CIJA).

Cantor emeritus
Growing up in Brooklyn, New York, Jacob Ben-Zion Mendelson witnessed the dwindling days of the Golden Age of Hazzanut. Cantor Mendelson is a graduate of the Hebrew Union College School of Sacred Music and the American Opera Center at the Juilliard School. He is the composer of Weekday Mincha and Maariv and Improvisations on Shabbat Shacharit published by the Cantors Assembly, the organization in which he served as president in 2003 and 2004. Cantor Mendelson's discography includes Cantorial Recitatives by Legendary Masters, The Birthday of the World Part I and Part II, A Taste of Eternity, narrated by Leonard Nimoy, Jewish Music and More, recorded with his wife, cantor Fredda Mendelson, Hazonos, called "...jazz album of the year" by Wired Magazine, recorded with Frank London and his son, Daniel Mendelson, and most recently, Further definitions of the Days of Awe, with the Afro Semitic Experience, also featuring his son Daniel.

Prominent members

References

External links
Official website

Conservative synagogues in New York (state)
Buildings and structures in White Plains, New York
Jews and Judaism in Westchester County, New York